Shwe Yin Myaw Pagoda (ရွှေရင်မျှော်ဘုရား)  is a Buddhist temple in Hpa-an, Kayin State on the bank of the Thanlwin River. The pagoda is the most well-known structure in Hpa-An and is a popular location for tourists to see the sunset.

Legend
Legend has it that the pagoda was built by a weizza (who married a dragon princess) and his daughter Queen Sawnanwai, as well as his son, a dragon king, who became nats (spirit) after they were died with a violent death. The dragon king and his enemy, the giant frog king, formed Hpa-an. The pagoda's grounds contain impressive statues of these legendary figures.

Gallery

References 

Buildings and structures in Kayin State
Buddhist temples in Myanmar
11th-century Buddhist temples
Buddhist pilgrimage sites in Myanmar